Isobutylbenzene is a chemical compound with the molecular formula C10H14.  It is used in the industrial manufacture of ibuprofen.

Isobutylbenzene is a colorless flammable liquid that is a respiratory irritant.

References 

Alkylbenzenes
C4-Benzenes